Systenoides is a genus of flies in the family Dolichopodidae. It is known from Paraguay, and contains only one species, Systenoides paraguayensis. The generic name refers to the similarity with the genus Systenus. The specific name is derived from Paraguay, the country where S. paraguayensis was collected.

References

Dolichopodidae genera
Neurigoninae
Diptera of South America
Monotypic Diptera genera
Endemic fauna of Paraguay
Invertebrates of Paraguay